John Harsh (September 25, 1825 – May 10, 1906) was an American farmer and politician.

Born in Warren, Ohio, Harsh settled in Milford, Jefferson County, Wisconsin, in 1850 and then moved to the town of Stockbridge, Calumet County, Wisconsin, where he had a farm, in 1852. Harsh enlisted in the Union Army during the American Civil War and was stationed in the commissary department in Saint Louis, Missouri. While in the Union Army, Harsh was stricken with typhoid fever and was sent home. He tried to reenlist in the army but was rejected because of his physical condition. During that time, Harsh served as chairman and supervisor of the Stockbridge Town Board. In 1875, Harsh served in the Wisconsin State Assembly as a Republican. In 1886, Harsh, his wife, and family moved to Oshkosh, Wisconsin. Harsh was also involved with the banking business. Harsh died at his home in Oshkosh, Wisconsin of pneumonia.

Notes

1825 births
1906 deaths
Politicians from Warren, Ohio
People from Stockbridge, Wisconsin
Politicians from Oshkosh, Wisconsin
People of Wisconsin in the American Civil War
Businesspeople from Wisconsin
Farmers from Wisconsin
Wisconsin city council members
Mayors of places in Wisconsin
People from Milford, Wisconsin
19th-century American politicians
Republican Party members of the Wisconsin State Assembly